Christa Lee Williams-Yates (born February 8, 1978) is an American, former collegiate three-time All-American, two-time Gold Medal winning Olympian, retired three-time pro All-Star, right-handed hitting softball pitcher originally from Houston, Texas. She competed at the 1996 Summer Olympics in Atlanta where she received a gold medal with the American team. Four years later at the 2000 Summer Olympics in Sydney, she won her second gold medal. Williams-Yates began her college career with the UCLA Bruins in 1997 before transferring to play softball with the Texas Longhorns (1998–99). Joining in its inaugural year, she played three years in the National Pro Fastpitch with the Texas Thunder (2004–06) and still ranks top-10 in career wins, strikeouts, ERA among other records. In 2018, Williams-Yates was named to the USA National Softball Hall of Fame. Currently, Williams-Yates teaches high school softball in Friendswood, Texas.

College
In her freshman year, Williams-Yates was named a National Fastpitch Coaches Association Third Team All-American. She was also named First Team All-Pac-12 She led the Bruins to the Women's College World Series and into the championship final where they lost to the Arizona Wildcats on May 26. Williams-Yates was named to the All-Tournament Team going 4-2, throwing two shutouts with 46 strikeouts.

Williams-Yates transferred to University of Texas for the next two seasons. She was named a NFCA First Team in 1998 and the Second Team in 1999. She also would earn two First-Team All-Big 12 selections. This helped earn her a place on Team USA for the 2000 Summer Olympics and Williams-Yates opted not to return for her senior year.

NPF
Williams-Yates was named an All-Star all three years of her career with the Texas Thunder. She debuted on June 1, 2004, throwing a two-hit shutout with 6 strikeouts over the Akron Racers. She no hit the Arizona Heat on June 18 with a 15 strikeout performance. On June 28, 2005, she set a personal best by fanning 17 of the Stratford Brakettes. Later that year beginning on July 7-August 6 she pitched a 10 consecutive game win streak, throwing 65.0 innings with 25 hits, 6 earned runs, 16 walks and 74 strikeouts for a 0.64 ERA and 0.63 WHIP.

Williams-Yates is the only NPF player to have played at least three seasons and be recognized as an All-Star every year of their career. She currently ranks top-10 in career statistics for wins, strikeouts, ERA, shutouts, strikeout ratio and WHIP.

Statistics

UCLA Bruins & Texas Longhorns

Team USA Olympic Games

National Pro Fastpitch Texas Thunder

References

 

1978 births
Living people
Softball players from Texas
Olympic softball players of the United States
Softball players at the 1996 Summer Olympics
Softball players at the 2000 Summer Olympics
Olympic gold medalists for the United States in softball
Texas Longhorns softball players
Medalists at the 2000 Summer Olympics
Medalists at the 1996 Summer Olympics
Sportspeople from Houston
UCLA Bruins softball players